Moxostoma, the redhorses or jumprocks, is a genus of North American ray-finned fish in the family Catostomidae.

Species 
 Moxostoma albidum (Girard, 1856) (Longlip jumprock)
 Moxostoma anisurum (Rafinesque, 1820) (Silver redhorse)
 Moxostoma ariommum C. R. Robins & Raney, 1956 (Bigeye jumprock)
 Moxostoma austrinum T. H. Bean, 1880 (Mexican redhorse)
 Moxostoma breviceps (Cope, 1870) (Smallmouth redhorse)
 Moxostoma carinatum (Cope, 1870) (River redhorse)
 Moxostoma cervinum (Cope, 1868) (Blacktip jumprock)
 Moxostoma collapsum (Cope, 1870) (Notchlip redhorse)
 Moxostoma congestum (S. F. Baird & Girard, 1854) (Gray redhorse)
 Moxostoma duquesni (Lesueur, 1817) (Black redhorse)
 Moxostoma erythrurum (Rafinesque, 1818) (Golden redhorse)
 Moxostoma hubbsi V. Legendre, 1952 (Copper redhorse)
 Moxostoma lacerum (D. S. Jordan & Brayton, 1877) (Harelip sucker)
 Moxostoma lachneri C. R. Robins & Raney, 1956 (Greater jumprock)
 Moxostoma macrolepidotum (Lesueur, 1817) (Shorthead redhorse)
 Moxostoma mascotae Regan, 1907 (Mascota jumprock)
 Moxostoma pappillosum (Cope, 1870) (V-lip redhorse)
 Moxostoma pisolabrum Trautman & R. G. Martin, 1951 (Pealip redhorse)
 Moxostoma poecilurum (D. S. Jordan, 1877) (Blacktail redhorse)
 Moxostoma robustum (Cope, 1870) (Robust redhorse)
 Moxostoma rupiscartes D. S. Jordan & O. P. Jenkins, 1889 (Striped jumprock)
 Moxostoma valenciennesi D. S. Jordan, 1885 (Greater redhorse)
 Moxostoma sp. 1 "Apalachicola" Undescribed,  (Apalachicola Redhorse)
 Moxostoma sp. 2 "Sicklefin" Undescribed,  (Sicklefin Redhorse)
 Moxostoma sp. 3 "Carolina" Undescribed,  (Carolina Redhorse)
 Moxostoma sp. 4 "Brassy" Undescribed,  (Brassy Jumprock)

References 
 
Georgia Biodiversity Portal. Table of Rare Fishes. June 7, 2022 version.
Fishes of North Carolina, Freshwater Fishes of North Carolina, Catostomidae. Freshwater Fishes of North Carolina. 2020 version.

 
Catostomidae
Taxa named by Constantine Samuel Rafinesque
Taxonomy articles created by Polbot